WWE Tribute to the Troops is an American annual professional wrestling event held by WWE and Armed Forces Entertainment. Since 2003, the show airs as a television special during the month of December (specifically during the holiday season), with the exception of the 2019 event, which was a special non-televised event, and the 2021 event, which aired in mid-November. As its name implies, the show honors and entertains United States Armed Forces members. Since 2020, the event airs on Fox and features wrestlers primarily from the SmackDown brand.

In the early years of the event, WWE put on shows for troops serving in Iraq and Afghanistan, with performers and employees traveling to these countries and interacting with troops, as well as visiting military camps, bases, and hospitals. In recent years, WWE has done the show in the U.S., promoting events at (and nearby) domestic military bases, as well as visiting sites such as Walter Reed Army Medical Center and Bethesda Naval Hospital. The 2021 event was the first one to not be held at or near a military base, and the first one to not air in December.

History 

The idea of the event is credited to wrestler John "Bradshaw" Layfield, who suggested it to WWE Chairman Vince McMahon.

WWE first held the event in December 2003, from Camp Victory in Baghdad, Iraq and aired it on Christmas Day as a special episode of SmackDown!. In the main event, John Cena defeated Big Show, and Stone Cold Steve Austin came out after the match, performed a Stunner on both men, and finally invited all the talent backstage to the ring to celebrate.  For this Tribute to the Troops and all others until 2011, commentary was recorded at WWE headquarters in Stamford, Connecticut, as commentators were not at ringside.

In December 2004, WWE traveled to COB Speicher in Tikrit, Iraq. The television show, Christmas in Iraq, aired on December 23 as another special SmackDown! episode. Eddie Guerrero and Rey Mysterio defeated Kurt Angle and Luther Reigns in the main event.

On December 9, 2005, WWE held the event at the Bagram Airfield in Bagram, Afghanistan. It aired December 19 on WWE Raw. In the main event, Shawn Michaels beat Triple H in a Boot Camp match.

In 2006, the show was taped at Camp Victory in Baghdad, aired on Raw on Christmas Day, and had Carlito pin Randy Orton in the main event. A day before taping, a mortar attack happened near the camp, injuring 14 soldiers. Michael Cole reported details from the scene minutes later.

In 2007, WWE returned to Tikrit. D-Generation X members Triple H and Shawn Michaels defeated Umaga and Mr. Kennedy in the main event, which aired on Christmas Eve on WWE Raw.

2008's show from Camp Liberty, Baghdad was the first to air in a non-standard WWE timeslot, a one-hour December 20 special on NBC. In its main event, John Cena, Batista and Rey Mysterio defeated Chris Jericho, Big Show and Randy Orton in a six-man tag team match.

WWE again traveled to Iraq in 2009. In the main event from Joint Base Balad, John Cena retained his WWE Championship against Chris Jericho. It aired on December 19, 2009 on NBC.

In 2010, WWE held its first domestically hosted Tribute to the Troops, from Fort Hood in Killeen, Texas on December 11. It aired on NBC December 18 for one hour, with a message from former president George W. Bush. A two-hour version of the show aired December 22 on USA Network.

The 2019 edition marked the first and so far only time that the event was not aired on television.

The 2020 edition returned to television, this time being broadcast from Orlando's Amway Center, by way of the WWE ThunderDome bio-secure bubble. The one-hour special aired on Fox on December 6, adjunct to NFL coverage.

Awards and honors 

 In 2004, the United Service Organizations (USO) of Metropolitan Washington awarded WWE with the first-ever Legacy of Hope award "for its extensive support of our troops and the USO's Operation Care Package program".
 In 2005, the Army and Air Force Exchange Service awarded WWE the first-ever Three-Commander Coin Award "for WWE's support of its partnership with AAFES to improve the quality of life for our troops by supporting service members and their families worldwide".
 During the 2006 show, Director of Air Force Morale, Welfare and Recreation Art Myers presented WWE Chairman Vince McMahon with the Secretary of Defense Exceptional Public Service Award. McMahon immediately presented the award to John Bradshaw Layfield, who had the idea for the show.
 In 2007, WWE received the first Corporate Patriot Award at the annual GI Film Festival in Washington, D.C., "in recognition of its ongoing support and appreciation of the U.S. military and their families, particularly its annual holiday Tribute to the Troops tour to entertain troops in war zones in Iraq and Afghanistan".
 In 2008, then President George W. Bush aired a message during the show, thanking WWE for giving US troops the gift of entertainment every Christmas. He did so again in 2010.
 In 2011 and 2012, WWE aired messages from President Barack Obama during the broadcasts, expressing his gratitude for the Armed Forces for their service in Iraq and Afghanistan.
 In 2015, WWE themselves began presenting a custom WWE Championship belt to the servicemen and women who have helped in hosting the event and for their continued service to the country. The custom belt features side plates that commemorate the year's event. They have presented custom belts every year since.

Results

References

Notes

External links 
 

Tribute to the Troops
American annual television specials
American Christmas television specials
Recurring events established in 2003
2003 American television series debuts
Military of the United States
Tribute